Sudhir Marutirao Dhagamwar (20 January 1951 – 10 April 2010) was an Indian cricketer. Dhagamwar was a right-handed batsman who was a leg break bowler.

Dhagamwar made his first-class debut for Vidarbha against Madhya Pradesh in the 1972/73 Ranji Trophy. Dhagamwar represented Vidarbha in 11 first-class matches from 1972/73 to the 1977/78 season, with his final first-class match coming against Uttar Pradesh. In his 11 matches for Vidarbha, he scored 288 runs at a batting average of 14.40, with a single half century score of 77. Dhagamwar later became a coach for Vidarbha.

Dhagamwar died at Nagpur, Maharashtra on 10 April 2010.

External links
Sudhir Dhagamwar at Cricinfo
Sudhir Dhagamwar at CricketArchive
Matches and detailed statistics for Sudhir Dhagamwar
Picture of Sudhir Dhagamwar

1951 births
2010 deaths
Cricketers from Nagpur
Indian cricketers
Vidarbha cricketers
Indian cricket coaches